Robert Bengtsson-Bärkroth (born 4 June 1968) is a retired Swedish football midfielder.

He played 239 matches in Allsvenskan. During his loan to Barnsley he featured once in the FA Cup and once in the League Cup, but not in the league. He is the father of Nicklas Bärkroth.

References

1968 births
Living people
Swedish footballers
Västra Frölunda IF players
Barnsley F.C. players
Örgryte IS players
Association football defenders
Allsvenskan players
Swedish expatriate footballers
Expatriate footballers in England
Swedish expatriate sportspeople in England
Footballers from Gothenburg